Samsung Galaxy M13 is a mid-range Android smartphone manufactured by Samsung Electronics as a part of its Galaxy M series. This phone was announced on 27 May 2022.

References 

Samsung Galaxy
Android (operating system) devices
Mobile phones introduced in 2022
Samsung smartphones
Mobile phones with multiple rear cameras
Samsung mobile phones